Wesley Roberts (born 24 June 1997) is a Cook Islands swimmer who competed at the 2016 Summer Olympics and holds several Cook Islands national records in swimming.

Personal life
From Atiu, Roberts attends Federation University in Australia. He is studying for a Bachelor of IT degree in software development.

Swimming career
Roberts won the gold medal in the men's 1500 and 400 metres long course freestyle event at the 2016 Oceania Swimming Championships. Roberts also won gold, 2 silver and a bronze in the 200 Freestyle, 400 Freestyle, 1500 Freestyle and the 100 Freestyle respectively at the 2019 Pacific Games, held in Apia, Samoa.

Roberts represented the Cook Islands at the 2016 Summer Olympics, where he swam in the men's 1500 metre freestyle.

References

External links

Olympic swimmers of the Cook Islands
Cook Island male swimmers
1997 births
Living people
People from Atiu
Swimmers at the 2016 Summer Olympics
Swimmers at the 2020 Summer Olympics
Swimmers at the 2022 Commonwealth Games
Commonwealth Games competitors for the Cook Islands